Villoglandular adenocarcinoma of the cervix is a rare type of cervical cancer that, in relation to other cervical cancers, is typically found in younger women and has a better prognosis.

A similar lesion, villoglandular adenocarcinoma of the endometrium, may arise from the inner lining of the uterus, the endometrium.

Signs and symptoms
The signs and symptoms are similar to other cervical cancers and may include post-coital bleeding and/or pain during intercourse (dyspareunia).  Early lesions may be completely asymptomatic.

Cause

Diagnosis
The diagnosis is based on tissue examination, e.g. biopsy.

The name of the lesion describes it microscopic appearance.  It has nipple-like structures with fibrovascular cores (papillae) that are long in relation to their width (villus-like), which are covered with a glandular pseudostratified columnar epithelium.

Treatment
The treatment is dependent on the stage. As the prognosis of this tumour is usually good, fertility sparing approaches (conization, cervicectomy) may be viable treatment options.

See also
 Endometrial cancer
 Glassy cell carcinoma
 Villous adenoma

References

Gynaecological cancer
Rare diseases